The Primrose International Viola Archive (PIVA) is the official viola archive of both the International Viola Society and American Viola Society. It is located in the Harold B. Lee Library at Brigham Young University. Scottish-American violist William Primrose started the archive with the donation of his many materials on the viola.

History

Brigham Young University faculty violist emeritus David Dalton studied viola under William Primrose at Indiana University. While writing Primrose's memoirs, Dalton suggested that the Harold B. Lee library could preserve Primrose's papers. After meeting with library officials in 1974, Primrose decided to donate his memorabilia to the Harold B. Lee library as part of a project to start a national-scale viola archive. In 1979, the archive was established, and the library's existing viola holdings along with Primrose's contributions formed the Primrose Viola Archive.

In 1981, the International Viola Society combined its archive in Austria with the Primrose archive, and the archive's name changed to the Primrose International Viola Archive. From 1983, the archive has collected newly published viola music and made a special effort to make its repository of viola music exhaustive. Notable donors include Jan Albrecht, Paul Doktor, Ulrich Druner, Walter Lebermann, Rudolf Tretzsch, Ernst Wallfisch, and Franz Zeyringer, founder of the International Viola Society. In 2005, Brigham Young University hosted the American Viola Society's Primrose International Viola Competition and Festival.

Holdings
The PIVA includes over 6,000 published scores, around 250 sound recordings, and hundreds of manuscripts and correspondence.

The collection includes viola manuscripts from Primrose's collection, a viola manuscript by Ernst Toch with a dedication to Primrose, a holograph score of Efrem Zimbalist's "Sarasateana: Suite of Spanish Dances," Milhaud's second viola concerto with a dedication from the composer, the working manuscript for Béla Bartók's viola concerto, and the manuscript for George Rochberg's Viola Sonata. The collection also includes Primrose recordings and a Primrose photo archive.

Gallery

References

External links
 Primrose International Viola Archive

Violas
Brigham Young University
1979 establishments in Utah
Archives in the United States
Harold B. Lee Library-related music articles